Salmon Branch is a stream in Hickman and Perry counties, Tennessee, in the United States.

Salmon Branch was named for a pioneer named Salmon who settled on the creek in about 1820.

See also
List of rivers of Tennessee

References

Rivers of Hickman County, Tennessee
Rivers of Perry County, Tennessee
Rivers of Tennessee